Adam Sebastian Helcelet (born 27 October 1991 in Turnov) is a Czech athlete who competes in the decathlon. He competed at the 2016 Summer Olympics.

International competitions

References

External links
 

1991 births
Living people
People from Turnov
Czech decathletes
World Athletics Championships athletes for the Czech Republic
European Athletics Championships medalists
Athletes (track and field) at the 2016 Summer Olympics
Olympic athletes of the Czech Republic
Athletes (track and field) at the 2020 Summer Olympics
Sportspeople from the Liberec Region